Roy Perry (born 12 February 1943) is a British Conservative Party politician. He was a Member of the European Parliament (MEP) from 1994 to 2004.

Background
Perry is a graduate of the University of Exeter with a degree in Government and Politics and was formerly a senior lecturer in Politics at Southampton Technical College.

Political career
Perry was an elected member of Test Valley Borough Council from 1979 to 1994. He was leader between 1985 and 1994. During this time, Perry contested the seat of Swansea West for the Conservatives in the 1992 general election. He was elected as Member of the European Parliament for the Wight and Hampshire South constituency in the 1994 European Parliament election and was re-elected under the new system of proportional representation in the 1999 European Parliament election.

In December 2002, Perry was placed sixth on the Conservative list for the 2004 elections.  Four Conservative MEPs were elected in the region so Perry was not.

Since the 2004 European Parliament election, Perry has concentrated on his roles as Director of the Trident Trust, Trustee of the Hampshire Museums Service, and Director of the Isle of Wight Partnership. He also led  Hampshire County Council (2013-2019).

Personal life
Perry is married with two daughters, one of whom, Caroline Nokes, was elected as  the Member of Parliament (MP) for Romsey and Southampton North in  the 2010 General Election.

References

External links

European Parliament
Conservative Party

1943 births
Living people
Alumni of the University of Exeter
Conservative Party (UK) MEPs
MEPs for England 1994–1999
MEPs for England 1999–2004
People educated at Tottenham Grammar School
Councillors in Hampshire
Conservative Party (UK) councillors
Leaders of local authorities of England
Members of Hampshire County Council